Great Sutton is a village in Cheshire West and Chester, England.  It contains four buildings that are recorded in the National Heritage List for England as designated listed buildings, all of which are listed at Grade II.  This grade is the lowest of the three gradings given to listed buildings and is applied to "buildings of national importance and special interest".  The listed buildings consist of a church and associated structures, a war memorial, and two lamp posts.


See also
Listed buildings in Ellesmere Port

References
Citations

Sources

Listed buildings in Cheshire West and Chester
Lists of listed buildings in Cheshire